Jean-Bernard Knepper (1638 – 14 November 1698) was a Luxembourg advocat and notary, who from  1693 to 1698 was the Mayor (Buergermeeschter) of the City of  Luxembourg.

Knepper was the son of Dominique Knepper, and went to the University of Dole in Besançon, Burgundy.  He studied for law, and was admitted to the Luxembourg bar on 23 May 1660. He became a judge by appointment of Louis XIV in 1687.

In 1661 he married Anna-Marguerite Trippel, the daughter of a shepherd from Thionville.

References
This article is based on material from the Lëtzebuergesch Wikipedia.

See also
 List of mayors of Luxembourg City

Independent politicians in Luxembourg
Luxembourgian notaries
University of Dole alumni
1638 births
1698 deaths
17th-century Luxembourgian judges